Capathia Jenkins is an American actress and singer. She is best known for her work as a Broadway performer, with roles in shows such as Caroline, or Change, Newsies, and Martin Short's Fame Becomes Me.

References

External links
 
 

African-American actresses
Living people
21st-century American actresses
Year of birth missing (living people)
Place of birth missing (living people)
21st-century African-American women singers